Lucas Otávio Veiga Lopes (born 9 October 1994), known as Lucas Otávio, is a Brazilian retired footballer who played as a defensive midfielder.

Club career
Born in Cornélio Procópio, Paraná, Lucas Otávio began his career in hometown's Bandeirantes Esporte Clube (BEC), and joined Santos FC in 2005, after impressing in a match against Peixe. In April 2012, he signed a three-year professional deal with the latter.

In July 2013, Lucas Otávio was promoted to Santos' main squad. On the 24th he made his first team debut, in a 2–0 away win against CRAC for the season's Copa do Brasil.

On 5 June 2014, Lucas Otávio was loaned to Série B side Paraná until December. A regular starter under manager Claudinei Oliveira, he eventually lost his place under Ricardinho, with his loan being cut short on 26 November due to an injury.

Lucas Otávio returned to Santos in 2015, being definitely included in the club's main squad. He made his Série A debut on 17 May, starting in a 1–0 home win against Cruzeiro.

On 29 September 2015 Lucas Otávio renewed his contract with Peixe, signing until January 2019. On 10 March of the following year, after receiving little playing time under new manager Dorival Júnior, he returned to Paraná on loan until December.

On 6 March 2017, Lucas Otávio was loaned to Avaí until the end of the season. The following 12 January, he joined Ituano also in a temporary deal.

Lucas Otávio left Santos in December 2018, as his contract expired, and subsequently joined PSTC. He scored his first senior goal with the latter side on 21 April 2019, netting his team's fifth in a 5–1 home routing of Nacional de Rolândia.

In May 2019, Lucas Otávio asked to leave the club for personal reasons. He subsequently retired, and became a player's agent.

Career statistics

Honours
Santos
Campeonato Paulista: 2015

References

External links
Santos FC official profile 

1994 births
Living people
People from Cornélio Procópio
Brazilian footballers
Association football midfielders
Campeonato Brasileiro Série A players
Campeonato Brasileiro Série B players
Santos FC players
Paraná Clube players
Avaí FC players
Ituano FC players
Paraná Soccer Technical Center players
Sportspeople from Paraná (state)